Vitrue, Inc. is a provider of social media publishing software, offering software-as-a-service (SaaS) tools that integrate with Facebook and Twitter.

Vitrue Inc. was founded in Atlanta in May 2006 by former Tandberg Television president Reggie Bradford with venture capital from General Catalyst Partners. The company offers software and services manage customer relations across the social web.

Working in partnership with Facebook as one of 14 original "Preferred Developer Consultants", Vitrue Publisher launched a suite of scheduling, moderation and analytics tools for marketers in 2009. In May 2010, they released Vitrue Tabs, which added module tools and a way for marketers to target and segment content to their communities geographically.

Vitrue acquired Sharkle in May 2006. , Vitrue is undergoing global expansion.

On May 23, 2012, Oracle Corporation announced the acquisition of Vitrue for $300 million.

Competitors in the space include Hearsay Social and Socialware.

References

External links
Vitrue.com

Software companies based in Georgia (U.S. state)
Oracle acquisitions
Software companies established in 2006
2006 establishments in Georgia (U.S. state)
Defunct software companies of the United States
2012 mergers and acquisitions
American corporate subsidiaries
American companies established in 2006